Keshavarz Alni Football Club is an Iranian football club based in the village of Alni outside the city of Meshkin shahr. They competed in the Ardabil Provincial League
They currently compete in the 2016–17 Hazfi Cup.
In the 2015-16 season the team also took third place in the Provincial League.

See also
 Hazfi Cup
 Alni

References

Football clubs in Iran
Association football clubs established in 2007
2007 establishments in Iran